The Bassetlaw Museum is a museum in Retford, Nottinghamshire which documents the history of North Nottinghamshire from the earliest times to the present day. It is situated on Grove Street, Retford.

History
The Bassetlaw Museum was created in 1983 and has a number of collections donated by people in the local area. The collections include local history, archaeology, decorative and fine art, agriculture, costume and textiles. The museum is situated in the 18th century Grade II* listed Amcott House on Grove Street, Retford where it moved in 1986. Admission to the museum is free.

Collection highlights

 Art gallery - built in 1994 and partly financed by the Percy Laws Memorial Fund of the Rotary Club of Retford.
 Photography - comprising the 21,000 negatives known as the Welchman Collection, which were taken by professional photographers Edgar Welchman and Son of Grove Street, Retford between 1910 and 1960. The photograph collection at the Museum also contains over 25,000 photographs of the towns and villages of North Nottinghamshire and people who lived there from about 1850s onwards.
 Carlton-in-Lindrick knight
 Anglo-Saxon log boat
 autochromes by Stephen Pegler
 The Pilgrims Gallery - which opened in 2019 to commemorate the 400th anniversary of the Mayflower's voyage to America in 1620. The Gallery features a recreation of William Brewster's study.
 Rural Heritage Centre
 Costume

Events and news

In July 2020, Bassetlaw Museum was the site of a community art project during the Coronavirus crisis called 'The Retford Positivity Rock Snake'.

In September 2021, Bassetlaw Museum hosted an event welcoming members of the Wampanoag Nation for The Wampanoag Perspective Project, led by Bassetlaw District Council and funded by the Arts Council and Nottinghamshire County Council. The cultural exchange project was aimed at hearing the Wampanoag perspective during the 400th year anniversary of the Mayflower sailing. The programme enabled primary age pupils to learn about Native American culture, the shared Wampanoag-Bassetlaw history, and to watch the assembly of a Wetu in the grounds of the museum.

Awards

 Bassetlaw Museum was voted the Nottinghamshire Museum of the Year in 2009.
 In 2002, the Heritage Lottery Fund gave the museum a grant of £78,000 to enable the purchase and digitisation of the Welchman Collection.
 In 2019 the museum was given £750,000 - £450,000 by the Heritage Lottery Fund and the rest from local sources - to build the Pilgrim's Gallery.

See also
Grade II* listed buildings in Nottinghamshire
Listed buildings in Retford

References

External Links 

Museums established in 1983
Museums in Nottinghamshire